The Baltimore, Chesapeake and Atlantic railroad, nicknamed Black Cinders & Ashes,  ran from Claiborne, Maryland (with steamship connections to Baltimore), to Ocean City, Maryland.
Chartered in 1886, the railroad started construction in 1889 and cost $2.356 million ($=).

The railroad also played a key role in the fight against racial segregation and the path to civil rights. Maryland civil rights advocates such as attorney William Ashbie Hawkins represented several plaintiffs before the Maryland Public Service Commission, protesting the segregated conditions maintained by the railroad in both the boats and trains under Maryland's Jim Crow laws in the 1910-1920s. Though Hawkins' various complaints were dismissed, the Public Service Commission did recommend changes such as ordering the BC&A to provide seating (with partitions) in nonsmoking as well as smoking cars to assure greater equality in the future. It would be another four decades until another Marylander, Elmer Henderson, was successful in arguing to the United States Supreme Court in 1950 that "...segregative dining practices on the railroads could not be equal". Henderson's court victory in integrating interstate travel contributed to Maryland's repeal of its railroad segregation laws in 1951. So as Bogen writes, "generations of protesters and lawyers who resisted segregation ... in Maryland played their role in making it possible for a woman in Montgomery, Alabama ...(Rosa Parks)... to change the world."

History 
Originally chartered in 1876  as the Baltimore & Eastern Shore Railroad Company and then reauthorized in 1886, incorporated March 2, 1886. The railroad started construction in 1889, completed on December 1, 1890. Also in 1890, the Baltimore & Eastern Shore Railroad Company purchased the Wicomico & Pocomoke Railroad (incorporated on February 15, 1848), consisting of approximately 30 miles of track from Salisbury to Ocean City, Maryland. The latter was chartered to operate from Salisbury to Ocean City, Md., of which the section from Salisbury to Berlin was opened for operation on May 1, 1868, and the section from Berlin to Ocean City, Md., in 1876. For the first year of operation, B&ES also operated a rail-transfer ferry from Bay Ridge (near Annapolis, Maryland) where the connection was made to Baltimore by rail.

B&ES struggled financially and it was put in the hands of a receiver after only nine months of operation. The receiver terminated the rail-transfer service to Bay Ridge and, instead, started direct passenger service between Baltimore and Claiborne.

The venture was not successful as on August 29, 1894, the B&ES railroad was liquidated in a judicial sale and the assets were sold to the re-organizers.  The new owner, the Baltimore Chesapeake and Atlantic railroad (BC&A) was incorporated on August 30, 1894, with its principal office in Salisbury, Maryland. That same year, the railroad also acquired several steamboat companies; namely the Maryland, Choptank and Eastern Shore Steamboat Companies, all of Baltimore, Md. for $1.7 million in waterline property, wharves and equipment. In 1902, the Pennsylvania railroad became the majority stockholder but the BC&A still operated under its organization.
 
As of 1915, the railroad consisted of a single-track, standard-gage railroad, with  distance of about 87 miles, with a branch line about 0.5 mile long extending from Salisbury to Fulton, Md., making a total of 87.252 miles. It also owned 15.582 miles of yard and side tracks. The new, combined operations of the BC&A in railroad and waterlines had been profitable with $0.5 million in profit on a total investment of $4.325 million with a total revenue of $17.8 million for the period of 1894 – 1915 and controlled by the Pennsylvania railroad as majority stockholder. Dividends were paid on $1.5 million par value of 5 per cent cumulative preferred stock but none were paid on the common stock of $1.0 million  and none paid on the preferred stock after 1912.
 
By 1921, the railroad had turned unprofitable due in part to private autos and trucks to the point where in March, 1922, it stopped making payments on its first mortgage. In 1921, the Pennsylvania railroad had to provide financial assistance in order for BC&A to make payments due under its first mortgage. This continued intermittently until 1926 when the Pennsylvania announced it was unwilling to continue this assistance. The following year, the trustee for the first mortgage, Chatham National Bank & Trust Co. of NY filed for foreclosure. The railroad was sold on March 29, 1928, to Charles Carter, representing Pennsylvania railroad interests and reorganized as the Baltimore and Eastern railroad, entirely owned by the Pennsylvania Railroad. 
The Baltimore and Eastern railroad survived up through the Penn central bankruptcy and ConRail merger but Conrail planned to abandon the B&E lines. In 1982, the State of Maryland purchased segments of the original Baltimore and Eastern Shore, Baltimore Chesapeake and Atlantic railways and other former PRR properties in Maryland from the Penn Central corporation, successor to the Penn Central Transportation Company.

Wicomico & Pocomoke Railroad Company (1848–1890) 

The railroad was incorporated on February 15, 1848  and reauthorized in 1864 was to connect Salisbury and Berlin, Maryland; 23 miles apart. At the time the railroad was chartered, there were no other railroads to connect with but instead the investors intended a connection with the steamboats on the Wicomico river in Salisbury, Maryland. When the road started construction in 1867, Dr. H. R. Pitts was president of the company  and completed in May, 1868. One of the original investors was Col. Lemuel Showell (d. 1902), of Berlin, who later became president.

The railroad started in Salisbury on the Wicomico river and then headed east crossing over the Eastern Shore railroad and then on to Walston's switch, Parsonsburg, Pittsville, Hancock, Whaleyville, St. Martins and finally Berlin. The original 20 mile line was extended in 1871, south 14 miles from Berlin to Snow Hill, Maryland, on the Pocomoke river and opened in 1872. This was done under the 1853 charter, revised in 1867, of the Worcester railroad.

During this same period, a Delaware railroad, the Junction and Breakwater railroad (Incorporated in 1856) with a vision of connecting the three states of Delaware, Maryland and Virginia was expanding southward. In 1874, the Philadelphia, Wilmington and Baltimore (PWB) railroad obtained a majority stockholder position and that same year completed the expansion south to the Maryland state-line. In 1874, the Junction and Breakwater railroad obtained a charter from the State of Maryland to consolidate a number of railroad companies in the State including the Worcester railroad.  

This meant purchasing the assets of the Wicomico & Pocomoke Railroad's extension to Snow Hill built under the Worcester railroad which it did in 1874. The newly consolidated railroad, inclusive of the W&P's Snow hill extension would operate in the State of Maryland as the Worcester railroad and would be completed to Franklin city, Virginia, in 1876.
The Wicomico & Pocomoke Railroad then used the funds from the 1874 sale of the Snow Hill extension to build another six mile extension in the same year, 1874, towards Hammock Point, just opposite of Ocean City. Passengers were then ferried over to the beaches. Two years later in 1876, the Wicomico & Pocomoke, operating as the Ocean City Bridge Company, built a toll bridge across Sinepuxent Bay, from Hommock Point to Ocean City, in Worcester county. This remained the only bridge into the city until a new State built auto bridge was completed in 1919. 
The Wicomico & Pocomoke Railroad inclusive of its interests in the bridge into Ocean City, operated by its subsidiary, Ocean City Bridge Company, was sold to the newly organized Baltimore & Eastern Shore railroad in 1888.

Baltimore & Eastern Shore Railroad Company (1886–1894) 

Originally chartered in 1876  as the Baltimore & Eastern Shore Railroad Company and then reauthorized in 1886, incorporated March 2, 1886. The objective of the railroad was to preserve the business connection of Baltimore with the Eastern Shore country. That business has been largely diverted to Philadelphia through the control of the Eastern Shore Railroad by the Philadelphia, Wilmington and Baltimore Railroad. The railroad was organized by Easton, Maryland, businessmen including Theophilus Tunis and Gen. Joseph B. Seth (1845–1927) who at the time was 69th Speaker of the Maryland House of Delegates and later President of the State Senate (1906–1908), and others. 
The railroad line as located extended from a terminus on the Chesapeake Bay, across the Eastern Shore, through Easton, to Salisbury, Maryland, where a connection was made with the Wicomico & Pocomoke road at Salisbury. The length of the proposed new road from the bay shore to Salisbury will be 52 miles, and it will make a line running diagonally across the Eastern Shore to Ocean City, 82 miles in length. From the proposed terminus on the bay shore the distance across Chesapeake Bay to Bay Ridge is 12 miles, which will be covered by a ferry, and at Bay Ridge connection will be made with the new Bay Ridge Annapolis road, over which trains will run to both the Annapolis & Baltimore Short Line and the Annapolis & Elk Ridge road.
At the same time, the State authorized the railroad the right to "the right to own land and develop resorts, to own steamboats and wharves, and to merge or lease railroads outside of the state."  The State authorized several municipalities to guarantee the bonds of up to $500,000 for the project.

Engineering and Construction
The B&ES started route location between Claiborne and Salisbury and completed location of the route in July 1886. The Railroad's Chief Engineer, William H. Eichelberger estimates the construction cost for the road to be $727,000 ($=) for the Claiborne-Salisbury segment, including a train ferry for Chesapeake service.  
The railroad started construction in 1889, completed on December 1, 1890, as well as purchasing the Wicomico & Pocomoke Railroad   The B&ES also operated a ferry from Claiborne to Annapolis, Maryland where connection was made to Baltimore by rail.

Revenue Operations
The venture was not successful as on August 29, 1894, the B&ES railroad was liquidated in a judicial sale and reorganized as the Baltimore, Chesapeake and Atlantic Railway Company.

Baltimore, Chesapeake and Atlantic Railway Company (1894–1928)  
The reorganized company, the Baltimore Chesapeake and Atlantic railroad (BC&A), was incorporated on August 30, 1894, with its principal office in Salisbury, Maryland. That same year, the railroad also acquired several steamboat companies; namely the Maryland, Choptank and Eastern Shore Steamboat Companies, all of Baltimore, Md. for $1.7 million in waterline property, wharves and equipment. In 1902, the Pennsylvania Railroad became the majority stockholder but the BC&A still operated under its organization.  
As of 1915, the railroad consisted of a single-track, standard-gage railroad, with  distance of about 87 miles, with a branch line about 0.5 mile long extending from Salisbury to Fulton, Md., making a total of 87.252 miles. It also owned 15.582 miles of yard and side tracks. The new, combined operations of the BC&A in railroad and waterlines had been profitable with $0.5 million in profit on a total investment of $4.325 million with a total revenue of $17.8 million for the period of 1894 – 1915 and controlled by the Pennsylvania railroad as majority stockholder. Dividends were paid on $1.5 million par value of 5 per cent cumulative preferred stock but none were paid on the common stock of $1.0 million  and none paid on the preferred stock after 1912.

By 1921, the railroad had turned unprofitable due in part to private autos and trucks to the point where in March, 1922, it stopped making payments on its first mortgage. In 1921, the Pennsylvania railroad had to provide financial assistance in order for BC&A to make payments due under its first mortgage. This continued intermittently until 1926 when the Pennsylvania announced it was unwilling to continue this assistance. The following year, the trustee for the first mortgage, Chatham National Bank & Trust Co. of NY filed for foreclosure. The railroad was sold on March 29, 1928, to Charles Carter, representing Pennsylvania railroad interests and reorganized as the Baltimore and Eastern railroad, entirely owned by the Pennsylvania Railroad.

Baltimore and Eastern Railroad Company (1923–1982)

Passenger service
Into the 1930s the Baltimore and Eastern Railroad operated passenger service from Ocean City, Maryland, to Berlin, Salisbury's Union Station, Delmar, Delaware, Hurlock, Easton, Queenstown, and finally to Love Point, a town on the eastern shore of the Chesapeake Bay. However, passenger service was terminated by 1938. The railroad survived up through the Penn Central bankruptcy and ConRail merger but Conrail planned to abandon the B&E lines.

Maryland Department of Transportation (1982– ) 
In 1982, the State of Maryland purchased segments of the original Baltimore and Eastern Shore, Baltimore Chesapeake and Atlantic railways and other former PRR properties in Maryland were sold by Penn Central corporation, successor to the Penn Central Transportation Company. The former BC&A segment was transferred to the State of Maryland for use by the Maryland Department of Transportation in 1982 is still owned by the State of Maryland.

Legacy

Racial segregation and the path to civil rights
In 1910, the state of Maryland established the Maryland Public Service Commission and granted it power over common carriers. Similar in nature to the federal Interstate Commerce Commission, "...the primary concern of the Maryland Public Service Commission was rate regulation, but it also had power to hear complaints about service." Shortly after its establishment, William Ashbie Hawkins represented several plaintiffs before the Public Service Commission protesting against the segregated conditions both in boats and trains under the Jim Crow law. 
December 1911, Hawkins filed suit against the Baltimore, Chesapeake and Atlantic Railway for discrimination on its Chesapeake Bay ferryboats, the Avalon and the Joppa. The steamer Avalon and Joppa  were sister ships originally built in 1888 for the Maryland Steamboat Company for the Choptank River route. Hawkins alleged several discrimination practices by the railroad, namely forcing blacks to use colored only cabins that were cramped and poorly ventilated, allowing blacks to eat only what food was left after all the whites had eaten and on one trip forcing "...ministers of the African Methodist Episcopal church and their wives who had taken a steamboat to Cambridge for a meeting were forced to sit in a salon all night because there were not enough staterooms available to them." 
Hawkins again sued BC&A over discrimination. In the case, Thomas Turner, a Baltimore school teacher complained that "...the only compartments in which African Americans could ride were a vestibule to or a partition in the smoking area for white men."  
Though Hawkins' various complaints were dismissed, the Public Service Commission did recommend changes such as ordering the BC&A to provide seating (with partitions) in nonsmoking as well as smoking cars to assure greater equality in the future. It would be another four decades until another Marylander, Elmer Henderson, was successful in arguing to the United States Supreme Court in 1950 that "...segregative dining practices on the railroads could not be equal".
"Under the rules of an interstate railroad, dining cars are divided so as to allot ten tables exclusively to white passengers and one table exclusively to Negro passengers, and a curtain separates the table reserved for Negroes from the others. Under these rules, only four Negro passengers may be served at one time, and then only at the table reserved for Negroes. Other Negroes who present themselves are compelled to await a vacancy at that table, although there may be many vacancies elsewhere in the diner. The rules impose a like deprivation upon white passengers whenever more than 40 of them seek to be served at the same time and the table reserved for Negroes is vacant."
The court held that these rules violated the Interstate Commerce Act, which makes it unlawful for a railroad in interstate commerce "to subject any particular person . . . to any undue or unreasonable prejudice or disadvantage in any respect whatsoever." Henderson's court victory in integrating interstate travel contributed to Maryland repeal of its railroad segregation laws in 1951. So as Bogen writes, "generations of protesters and lawyers who resisted segregation ... in Maryland played their role in making it possible for a woman in Montgomery, Alabama ...(Rosa Parks)... to change the world."

See also

 List of defunct Maryland railroads

Notes
W. H. Eichelberger recorded a Plat of Lots for Sale at Wrights Summit, Clinch Valley Railroad, Tazewell Co., Va. 19 x 15 in. [FOLDER C-5], Special Collections, 
University Libraries (0434), Virginia Tech, 560 Drillfield Drive, Blacksburg, VA 24061. In 1879, the Harrisburg and Potomac railroad Officers have been elected including W Eichelberger. The Railway World, Volume 5, 1879.

References

External links
 Baltimore and Eastern Railroad/Baltimore and Virginia Steamboat Company
 Abandoned Railroads of Maryland Website: McDaniel to Ocean City
 Eastern Shore Railroad history
 Pennsylvania Railroad Chesapeake Region maps and track charts
 Corporate Genealogy: Baltimore, Chesapeake & Atlantic Railway
 "The Pennsylvania Railroad Company: The Corporate, Financial and Construction History of Lines Owned, Operated and Controlled To December 31, 1945, Volume IV Affiliated Lines, Miscellaneous Companies, and General Index; Coverdale & Colpitts,Philadelphia, Allen, Lane & Scott, 1946  General discussion on corporate history of the BC&A and Baltimore and Eastern on page 467. 
 Fate of the Choptank River Steamboats Joppa and Avalon from Choptank River Heritage.
 In Wicomico, old rail is not quite a trail

History of Maryland
Defunct Maryland railroads
Railway companies established in 1884
Railway lines opened in 1889
Railway companies disestablished in 1894
Railway companies disestablished in 1928
Predecessors of the Pennsylvania Railroad